Shek Wai Hung (born 10 October 1991) is an artistic gymnast from Hong Kong. He is the current Asian Games champion on vault.

Gymnastics career

Shek started gymnast training at the age of six. In 2008, Shek participated in the Pacific Rim Gymnastics Championships, where he won a gold medal in the junior vault final. At the 2010 Asian Games, Shek placed eighth in the individual all-around, and sixth on vault.

In 2011, Shek participated in the World Championships in Tokyo, Japan, where he qualified fourth with an average score of 16.237 into the vault final – the first time ever for a Hong Kong gymnast to qualify into an event final at World Championships level. He came seventh in the final, having taken a big step forward on his first vault, with an average score of 15.950.

Shek qualified to the 2012 Summer Olympics in London, the United Kingdom via the Olympic Test Event in January that year. There, he finished 12th in the all-around qualification with a score of 86.482. This was the first time for Hong Kong to qualify two gymnasts, Shek and teammate Angel Wong to artistic gymnastics competition at the Olympic Games. The Olympics, however, proved to be a disappointing one to him. A fall on his first vault during qualification prevents Shek from advancing into the vault final, his strongest event.

Despite consideration of retiring from elite gymnastics, Shek continued his training after the disappointment at the London Olympics. In 2014, Shek participated in the Asian Games held in Incheon, South Korea, in which he had a surprising victory over the reigning Olympic Champion, World Champion and Asian Games champion on vault, Yang Hak-seon by a narrow margin of 0.016 points. Shek also made history of being the first gymnast from Hong Kong to win a medal in artistic gymnastics event at the Asian Games. Just two weeks after the Asian Games, Shek took part in the 2014 World Artistic Gymnastics Championships in Nanning, China, where he came sixth in the vault final with an average score of 14.999.

In 2015, Shek competed at the World Championships held in Glasgow, the United Kingdom, where he came 36th in the individual all-around qualification and 10th on vault, being the second reserve of the vault final.

In 2018, Shek participated in the 2018 Asian Games held in Jakarta, Indonesia, where he won the gold medal in the Men's Vault.

References

1991 births
Living people
Hong Kong male artistic gymnasts
Gymnasts at the 2012 Summer Olympics
Gymnasts at the 2020 Summer Olympics
Olympic gymnasts of Hong Kong
Gymnasts at the 2010 Asian Games
Gymnasts at the 2014 Asian Games
Gymnasts at the 2018 Asian Games
Asian Games gold medalists for Hong Kong
Asian Games medalists in gymnastics
Medalists at the 2014 Asian Games
Medalists at the 2018 Asian Games